A mixed reality game (or hybrid reality game) is a game which takes place in both reality and virtual reality simultaneously. According to Souza de Silva and Sutko, the defining characteristic of such games is their "lack of primary play space; these games are played simultaneously in physical, digital or represented spaces (such as a game board)". There is equivalence in definitions pertaining to their existence in mixed reality. Given the definition for mixed reality by Paul Milgram and Fumio Kishino for the virtuality continuum, virtual reality games are not mixed reality games, because they take place only in virtual reality. Souza de Silva and Sutko state that pervasive games are a subset of hybrid reality games.

References

External links 
 Mixed reality pong